The Debatable Lands, also known as debatable ground, batable ground or threip lands, lay between Scotland and England. It was formerly in question as to which it belonged when they were distinct kingdoms. The name either signifies litigious or disputable ground, or it comes from the Old English word 'battable' (land suitable for fattening livestock).

History
The Debatable Lands extended from the Solway Firth near Carlisle to Langholm in Dumfries and Galloway, the largest population centre being Canonbie. The lands included the baronies of Kirkandrews, Bryntallone and Morton. The boundaries were marked by the rivers Liddel and Esk in the east and the River Sark in the west.

The origins of the peculiar status of this territory have been the subject of various interpretations. One of the more convincing proposals is that it arose from a landholding created on both sides of the Esk in the twelfth century. For over three hundred years the area was effectively controlled by local Riding Surnames or clans, such as the Armstrongs, who successfully resisted any attempt by the Scottish or English governments to impose their authority. In his history of the Border Reivers (The Steel Bonnets, 1971), George MacDonald Fraser says that the Armstrongs alone could put 3,000 men in the field. They launched frequent raids on farms and settlements outside the Debatable Lands, the profits enabling them to become major landowners.

Other clans in the area were the Elwands, Ellwoods, or Eliotts who extended into Teviotdale; the Nixons who were more numerous in Cumberland; the Crossars in Upper Liddesdale, with their chief stronghold in Riccarton/Riccarton Mill (Rickerton, forms of Richardtown), Northern/Upper Liddesdale (listed in valleys of Liddesdale as locus/locality of Croyser 1376) of Hudhouse also located nearby on Liddel (it is a mistake to suppose they settled in Debatable lands on the lower Liddel though at Riccarton, and Hudhouse they were on the upper end of the Liddel Water); and the Grahams, who owned five towers in the Debatable Land. The Irvings, Carruthers, Olivers, Bells, Dicksons, and Littles were also present in varying numbers.

In 1530, King James V of Scotland took action against the lawless clans of the Debatable Lands and imprisoned the Lords Bothwell, Maxwell and Home, Walter Scott of Buccleuch, and other border lairds for their lack of action. James took various other steps, but significantly he broke the strength of the Armstrongs by hanging Johnnie Armstrong of Gilnockie and thirty-one others at Caerlanrig Chapel, under questionable circumstances.

In 1552, Commissioners from Scotland and England met and divided the Debatable Lands between England and Scotland, with a line, known as the Scots' Dike, drawn from Esk to Sark, abolishing the Debatable Lands' de facto independence from either crown. Since then, the Anglo-Scottish border has remained essentially unchanged.

The 1552 division of the Debatable Lands, the Scots' Dike and the several changes to the status of Berwick-upon-Tweed between the thirteenth to fifteenth centuries until it finally became English in 1482, remains the only significant alterations to the border agreed in the 1237 Treaty of York.

In 1590 James VI of Scotland declared that the Debatable lands and the lands of Canonbie were annexed to the crown, and he set new leases to various landowners.

See also
 Anglo-Scottish border
 Berwick-upon-Tweed
 Dumfriesshire
 History of Cumbria
 Liddesdale
 List of places in the Scottish Borders
 March law (Anglo-Scottish border)
 Scottish Marches
 Scots' Dike
 Solway Firth
 Treaty of York

Notes

References

John M. Todd (2006), 'The West March on the Anglo-Scottish Border in the Twelfth Century, and the Origins of the Western Debatable Land', Northern History, 43:1, 11–19, DOI: 10.1179/174587006X86783 
Attribution

Further reading

External links 
SCRAN: Johnnie Armstrong - A Reiver's Story
SCRAN: Family Names: Armstrong
The Debatable Land
Video on the 'Monition of Cursing' stone, Carlisle.

History of the Scottish Borders
Military history of the United Kingdom
History of Dumfriesshire
Anglo-Scottish border
Disputed territories in Europe
Former disputed land areas